R352 road may refer to:
 R352 road (Ireland)
 R352 road (South Africa)